Michael Gene Lucci (December 29, 1939 – October 26, 2021) was an American professional football player who was a linebacker for 12 seasons in the National Football League (NFL). He played for the Cleveland Browns for three seasons from 1962 to 1964 and nine seasons with the Detroit Lions from 1965 to 1973. Lucci played college football at the University of Tennessee and for one year at the University of Pittsburgh.

Lucci joined the Lions as a result of a three-team transaction on August 30, 1965. He, along with a draft pick, was first sent by the Browns to the New York Giants for all-pro cornerback Erich Barnes. Then the Giants traded him, guard Darrell Dess and a draft pick to the Lions for quarterback Earl Morrall.

He was a 6'2", 230-pound middle linebacker known for his ability to play through injury. Lucci’s defensive coverage abilities earned him a total of 21 career interceptions with Detroit. He returned four of those interceptions for touchdowns. Lucci was voted by his teammates the Lions’ Defensive Most Valuable Player from 1969-1971. In addition, he was All-NFL in 1969, NFC All-Conference in 1970-1973. Lucci was named to the Pro Bowl following the 1971 season where he intercepted five passes, two of which he returned for touchdowns. On one return, Jets quarterback Joe Namath injured his knee attempting to tackle Lucci and Namath has said that injury was the downturn in his career.

Acting and broadcasting
Lucci appeared as himself in the 1968 film Paper Lion, and as a hitman in the 1973 film Detroit 9000. He also appeared in commercials for Alitalia Airlines. From 1976 to 1978 Lucci served as a color analyst for Lions broadcasts on WJR radio. In 1979 he was a part-time NFL analyst for NBC television.

Business career
After retiring from the NFL Lucci was a successful business executive and entrepreneur.  He was the former president of Bally Total Fitness which at the time was the largest commercial operator of fitness centers in the United States.

Lucci divided his time between homes in Michigan and Palm Beach County, Florida. Mike Lucci died following an extended illness on October 26, 2021, in Florida at the age of 81.

References

External links
Mike Lucci career stats
The Pennsylvania Football News All-Century Team
Bally Total Fitness Official website

1939 births
2021 deaths
American football linebackers
Cleveland Browns players
Detroit Lions announcers
Detroit Lions players
National Conference Pro Bowl players
National Football League announcers
People from Ambridge, Pennsylvania
Pittsburgh Panthers football players
Players of American football from Pennsylvania
Sportspeople from the Pittsburgh metropolitan area
Tennessee Volunteers football players